Letty Leonor Quintero Orrego (born 13 November 1985) is an Ecuadorian former footballer who played as a full-back. She has been a member of the Ecuador women's national team.

Club career
Quintero has played for the Guayas selection in Ecuador.

International career
Quintero represented Ecuador at the 2004 South American U-19 Women's Championship. She capped at senior level during the 2006 South American Women's Football Championship.

References

1985 births
Living people
Ecuadorian women's footballers
Women's association football fullbacks
Ecuador women's international footballers
21st-century Ecuadorian women